Celastrinites is an extinct genus of prehistoric plants in the family Celastraceae. Celastrinites wardii is from the Cretaceous of British Columbia, Canada. C. elegans is from the Florissant fossil bed of Colorado.

References 

 A catalogue of the Cretaceous and Tertiary plants of North America. Frank Hall Knowlton,  1898

External links 

 Celastrinites wardii at fossilworks

Cretaceous angiosperms
Prehistoric angiosperm genera
Celastrales genera
Celastraceae
Prehistoric plants of North America